Anna Wiktoria German-Tucholska (14 February 1936 – 26 August 1982) was a Polish singer, immensely popular in Poland and in the Soviet Union in the 1960s–1970s. She released over a dozen music albums with songs in Polish, as well as several albums with Russian repertoire. Throughout her music career, she also recorded songs in the German, Italian, Spanish, English, and Latin languages.

Biography

Anna German was born in the town of Urgench in Uzbekistan (Central Asia; then the Uzbek Soviet Socialist Republic of the Soviet Union). Her mother, Irma Martens, was a descendant of Plautdietsch-speaking Mennonites invited to Russia by Empress Catherine the Great. Her accountant father, Eugen (Eugeniusz) Hörmann (in Russian, Герман), was also of a German–Russian pastor family and born in Łódź in Congress Poland (part of the Russian Empire), now in Poland. Eugen Hörmann's father, Anna's grandfather, Friedrich Hörmann, who had studied theology at Łódź, was in 1929 incarcerated in Gulag Plesetsk by communists for being a priest; he died there. In 1937, during the NKVD's anti-German operation, Eugen Hörmann was arrested in Urgench on false charges of spying, and executed (officially, sentenced to ten years in prison). Thereafter Anna, with her mother and grandmother, survived in the Kemerovo Region of Siberia, as well as in Tashkent, and later in the Kirghiz and Kazakh SSRs.

In 1946, German's mother (who had married Herman Gerner, a Polish People's Army soldier) was able to take the family to Silesia, first to Nowa Ruda and in 1949 to Wrocław.

Anna quickly learned Polish and several other languages and grew up hiding her family heritage. She graduated from the Geological Institute of the University of Wrocław. During her university years, she began her music career at the Kalambur Theater. German became known to the general public when she won the 1964 II Festival of Polish Songs in Opole with her song Tańczące Eurydyki ('Dancing Eurydices'). One year later, she won the first prize in the Sopot International Song Festival. 

German performed in the Marché international de l'édition musicale in Cannes, as well as on the stages of Belgium, Germany, United States, Canada and Australia.

She also sang in Russian, English, Italian, Spanish, Latin, German and Mongolian. In 2001, six of her Polish albums were reissued on CDs. In recent years, many compilation albums of her songs have also been released in both Russia and Poland.

Career in Italy 

In December 1966 in Milan, German signed a contract with the CDI company to release her records, thus becoming the first performer from behind the "Iron Curtain" who recorded in Italy. In Italy, German had performed at the Sanremo Music Festival, starred in a television show, recorded a programme with the singer Domenico Modugno, performed at the festival of Neapolitan songs in Sorrento and received the "Oscar della simpatia" award.

Car accident and treatment 

On 27 August 1967, while in Italy, on the road between Forlì and Milan, Anna German was involved in a severe car accident. At high speed, the car driven by the impresario of the singer crashed into a concrete fence. German was thrown from the car through the windshield. She suffered multiple fractures and other internal injuries. An investigation revealed that the driver of the car – her manager Renato Serio – fell asleep at the wheel. In aftermath, Serio received only a fracture of the hand and foot. The third passenger, singer Elena Zagorskaya, suffered some scratches but was not seriously injured. Meanwhile, German survived the biggest wounds, and had not regained consciousness in aftermath of the crash. After the plaster was taken off, the singer still lay in a hospital bed for half a year. Then it took her a few months to relearn to sit and walk.

Later, she released the autobiographical book Wróć do Sorrento? ('Come Back to Sorrento?'), dedicated to the Italian period of her career. The book's circulation was 30,000 copies.

Career in the Soviet Union  

In the 1970s, German toured, performed and recorded in the Soviet Union, working with Aleksandra Pakhmutova, Yevgeniy Martynov, Vladimir Shainsky, David Tukhmanov, Oscar Feltsman, Yan Frenkel, Vyacheslav Dobrynin, Alexander Morozov and others. She had become an acclaimed and popular artist there. She remembers: "I loved touring the Soviet Union. <...> These tours did not bring a lot of money, it was much more profitable to fly to America or even participate in some kind of concerts in Europe. But nothing can compare with the emotional reception in Soviet cities and towns."

Personal life 

On 23 March 1972, German married Zbigniew Tucholski. Their son, Zbigniew Tucholski, was born in 1975. In the last years of her life, German composed some church songs. Before she died in 1982 of osteosarcoma (at the age of 46), she joined the Seventh-day Adventist Church. German was buried at the Evangelical Cemetery in Warsaw.

Anna loved to cook oriental dishes. Her other favorite foods were boiled potatoes with herring, pickles, pies with cabbage, black tea with lemon, and oatmeal cookies. She did not consume alcohol.

Remembrance

The main street in Urgench, Uzbekistan, the birthplace of Anna German, bears her name.
The asteroid 2519 Y discovered in 1975 by Russian astronomer Tamara Smirnova was named in honour of Anna German.
The amphitheatre in Zielona Góra, Poland, has been named in Anna German's memory.
In 2002, the  Song Festival aimed at popularizing the musical legacy of Anna German and Polish popular music was launched.
The Anna German Musical High School in Białystok bears the name of the singer.
In 2012, a commemorative plaque was unveiled in Wrocław at the entrance to the house where Anna German used to live.
In 2012, a Russian biographical mini-series (co-produced with Poland, Ukraine and Croatia) about the life of Anna German was filmed.
A star on the Moscow Walk of Fame honouring Anna German was unveiled.
Several streets in Polish cities including Warsaw and Rzeszów were named in remembrance of the singer.
In 2013, a star on the Walk of Fame of the National Festival of Polish Song in Opole devoted to Anna German was unveiled.

Books about Anna German 

 1974 Nagrabiecki Jan: Anna German. 1974
 Aleksander Zygariov: Anna German. 1988
 Aleksander Zygariov: Anna German. 1998 (reissue)
 Mariola Pryzwan: . 1999
 Adriana Polak: . 2000
 Artur Hörmann: . 2003 (The book was written by the uncle of Anna and brother her father Eugene Herman)
 Mariola Pryzwan: . 2008
 Ivan Ilichev: Анна Герман – Гори, гори, моя звезда!. 2010
 Jordan Naoum: Anna German. 2011 
 Mariola Pryzwan: . 2012
 Ivan Ilichev: Мы долгое эхо (We long echo). 2012
 Mariola Pryzwan: . 2013
 Marzena Baranowska: . 2013
 Ivan Ilichev: Анна Герман. Белый ангел песни (White angel of the song). 2013
 German. Śpiewający anioł. Super album. 2013
 Ivan Ilichev: Эхо любви (Echoes of love). 2013
 Volga Yerafeyenka: . 2014
 Irma Martens-Berner: . 2014,  (Consultants books: son A. German, Dr. Zbigniew I. Tucholsky and her husband, engineer Zbigniew A. Tucholsky)
 Ivan Ilichev: Анна Герман. Сто воспоминаний о великой певице (Anna German. A hundred memories of great singer). 2016

Literary works 

 1970  (Come Back to Sorrento?...)
  (The tale of the winged Starling). The book is written by Anna to her son
 1988 «Вернись в Сорренто?...» translated from Polish into Russian by R. Bello
 2002  reissue
 2012  reissue

Discography

Albums

  (1964) [Onto that shore] 
  (1965) [Dancing Eurydices]
  (1967) [A recital of songs]
 I classici della musica napoletana (1967) [Classics of the Canzone Napoletana]
  (1970) [Fate of Man]
  (1971) [Domenico Scarlatti – Arias from opera Tetide in Sciro]
  (1972) [Wind lives in wild poplars]
  (1974) [It has to be May]
 Anna German(1977)
 Anna German(1979)
  (1979) [Think about me]
  (1979) [Only in tango/Summer is all around]
  (1979) [Anna German is singing]
 Надежда (Nadezhda, 1980) [Hope]
 Последняя встреча (1982) [Last meeting]

Singles

 "The Man I Love" (1964)
 "" / "" (1967)
 "" / "" (1967)
 "" / "" (1967)
 "" / "" (1969)
 "" / "" (1970)
 "" / "" (1970)
 "" / "" (1970)
 "" / "" (1971)
 "" / "" (1972)

Later reprints and compilation albums

 1984:   LP
 1987:  Эхо любви (Echo lubvi) – live '79 LP
 1989:  Anna German LP
 1989:   LP
 1990:   vol. 1 LP
 1990:   vol. 2 LP
 1991:   CD
 1991:   CD
 1994:   CD
 1994:   MC
 1995:   part 1 MC
 1995:   part 2 MC
 1996:  Незабытый мотив (Nezabitiy motiv) CD
 1996:  Лучшие песни (Luchshie pesni) CD
 1998:  Когда цвели сады (Kogda tsveli sadi) CD
 1998:   CD
 1999:   CD
 1999:   CD
 1999:   CD
 1999:   CD
 1999:  Антология советского шлягера (Antologia sovetskogo shlagera) MC
 2000:  Анна Герман. Российская эстрадная музыкальная энциклопедия (Rossiyskaya estradnaya muzikalnaya encyclopaedia) CD
 2000:  Последняя встреча (Poslednyaya vstrecha) CD
 2001:  Quiet words of love (Russian) (Любви негромкие слова) CD
 2001:  Ваши любимые песни (Vashi lyubimie pesni) CD
 2001:   CD
 2001:   CD
 2001:   CD
 2001:   CD
 2001:  Domenico Scarlatti –  "Tetida in Sciro" CD
 2001:   CD
 2001:   CD
 2001:  Luchshee – Zvyozdi sovetskoy estradi CD
 2002:   CD
 2003:  Наши лучшие песни (Nashi lyubimie pesni) CD
 2003:   collection CD
 2003:  Золотой век русской эстрады (Zolotoy vek russkoy estrady) CD
 2003:  Посидим, помолчим. Полное собрание песен (Posidim, pomolchim) vol.1 CD
 2003:  Спасибо тебе мое сердце. Полное собрание песен (Spasibo tebe moyo serdtse) vol.2 CD
 2004:   CD
 2004:  Самое лучшее (Samoe luchshee) CD
 2007: MP3 collection
 2013:  CD
 2019: Анна Герман. Избранное LP

Filmography

 1966:  (documentary) – ensemble cast
 1970: Landscape After the Battle
 1970: Prom – singing
 1970:  (TV show) – singing
 1970:  (short film)
 1977:  (film) – singing 
 2012: Anna German (Russian TV series) – singing (her songs have been used in the series)

See also

Music of Poland
List of Polish people

References

External links

 
Facebook page dedicated to Anna German
Anna German- Website

1936 births
1982 deaths
English-language singers from Poland
Italian-language singers
Russian-language singers
Polish people of German-Russian descent
Soviet emigrants to Poland
Deaths from cancer in Poland
Deaths from bone cancer
Polish pop singers
People from Xorazm Region
20th-century Polish women singers
Polish Seventh-day Adventists
Mennonite musicians